International is a 1975 studio album released by the female girl group The Three Degrees.

The album includes the 1974 hit single, "TSOP (The Sound of Philadelphia)". In the United Kingdom, the album was released under the title Take Good Care of Yourself, where it charted at #6, in Europe the album was issued with the alternative title of With Love. The album was also issued in Japan with an alternative running order and several different tracks.

The album was re-issued in October 2010, for the first time in its entirety on CD by Big Break Records. This re-issue includes only foreign language songs previously available in the Far East and a 1977 remix of "TSOP (The Sound of Philadelphia)" by Tom Moulton.

Track listing

Personnel
The Three Degrees
 Sheila Ferguson - vocals
 Valerie Holiday - vocals
 Fayette Pinkney - vocals
Musicians
Bobby Eli, Norman Harris, Reginald Lucas, Roland Chambers, T.J. Tindall - guitar
Lenny Pakula, Leon Huff, Eddie Green, Harold Williams - keyboards
Anthony Jackson, Ronnie Baker - bass
Earl Young, Karl Chambers, Norman Farrington - drums
Larry Washington - congas, bongos
Vince Montana - vibraphone
Bobby Martin, John Davis, Jack Faith, Lenny Pakula - arrangements
Technology
Jay Mark, Joe Tarsia - engineer
Ed Lee - design
Peter Lavery - photography

Charts

Singles

External links
 The Three Degrees-International at Discogs

References

1975 albums
The Three Degrees albums
Albums produced by Kenneth Gamble
Albums produced by Leon Huff
Albums arranged by Bobby Martin
Albums recorded at Sigma Sound Studios
Philadelphia International Records albums